This is the list of cathedrals in Papua New Guinea sorted by denomination.

Catholic
The following cathedrals of the Catholic Church in Papua New Guinea (all of which are of the Latin Rite) are located in Papua New Guinea:
 St. Ignatius Cathedral in Aitape
 Cathedral of the Sacred Heart of Jesus in Alotau
 Our Lady of the Sacred Heart Cathedral in Bereina
 Our Lady of the Assumption Cathedral in Hahela
 St. Gerard’s Cathedral in Kiunga
 St. Louis de Montfort Co-Cathedral in Daru
 Mary Help of Christians Cathedral in Kefamo near Goroka
 Our Lady of the Sacred Heart Cathedral in Kavieng
 Holy Spirit Cathedral in Kerema
 Mary Help of Christians Cathedral in Kimbe
 Mary Help of Christians Cathedral in Kundiawa
 St Mary’s Cathedral in Lae
 Holy Spirit Cathedral in Madang
 Mother of the Divine Shepherd Cathedral in Mendi
 Holy Trinity Cathedral in Mount Hagen
 St Mary's Cathedral in Port Moresby
 Sacred Heart Cathedral in Kokopo
 St Francis Xavier’s Co-Cathedral in Rabaul
 Good Shepherd Cathedral in Sangurap near Wabag
 Christ the King Cathedral in Wewak

Anglican
The following cathedrals of the Anglican Church of Papua New Guinea are located in Papua New Guinea:
 St John's Cathedral in Port Moresby
 Resurrection Cathedral in Popondetta
 Ss Peter and Paul Cathedral in Dogura, Milne Bay Province

See also
List of cathedrals

References

Papua New Guinea
Churches in Papua New Guinea
Cathedrals
Cathedrals